Koronos (Greek:(η) Κόρωνος) is one of the mountain villages on the Greek island of Naxos in the Cyclades group of islands. Situated in the northeast part of the island, Koronos lies on the northeast slopes of the Koronion Oros, the second tallest mountain on the island and has the second highest altitude of the villages at 630 meters above sea level. Along with Apiranthos (T'aperathou) and Keramoti, Koronos belongs to the Smiridohoria or the emery-producing villages of Naxos.

References 

Naxos
Populated places in Naxos (regional unit)